Zgornja Lipnica is a settlement in the Municipality of Radovljica in the Upper Carniola region of Slovenia.

Name
The name Zgornja Lipnica literally means 'upper Lipnica', distinguishing the village from neighboring Spodnja Lipnica (literally, 'lower Lipnica'), which stands at an elevation  lower. The name Lipnica, like related names (e.g., Lipa, Lipnik, Lipovec, etc.), is derived from the Slovene common noun lipa 'linden', referring to the local vegetation.

History
Lipnica Castle was built there in the 12th century and was owned by the Counts of Ortenburg. It came under the control of the Counts of Celje in 1418 and then the House of Habsburg in 1456. It was destroyed by forces commanded by the 15th-century Czech mercenary Jan Vitovec. The castle was then rebuilt, but it was burned in the 16th century.

Mass graves

Zgornja Lipnica is the site of two known mass graves from the period immediately after the Second World War. The Lancovo 1 and 2 mass graves lie north of the settlement and contain the bodies of a large number of civilians and Croatian soldiers murdered on the night of May 15, 1945. The second grave lies on a wooded slope near the first.

References

External links

Zgornja Lipnica at Geopedia

Populated places in the Municipality of Radovljica